Halifax Regional Council is the governing body of Halifax, known as the Halifax Regional Municipality (HRM). Halifax is governed by a mayor-council system, where councillors are elected from sixteen geographic districts though a first-past-the-post system and the mayor is elected via a municipality-wide first-past-the-post vote. Halifax Regional Council was formed in 1996 and consisted of twenty-three councillors and one mayor. It was reduced in size to sixteen councillors and the mayor in 2012. The council meets at Halifax City Hall.

Structure
The powers and authority of Halifax are laid out in the Halifax Regional Municipality Charter (2008).  Halifax Regional Council has established standing committees, community councils and advisory committees to aid in policy development and decision making.

Standing committees are composed of councillors, and have responsibility over key functional areas of the municipality, such as transportation or the environment, and can propose, review, debate prior to forwarding reports to council with recommendations. Community councils are composed of councillors and have purview over development, land use, park and community issues in their geographic area, as well as appointments to standing committees.  Advisory committees include councillors and citizens, and provide specific advice.

Generally each councillor sits on two standing committees, one or more external boards, and one or more advisory committees. The mayor is a member of all committees and is entitled to one vote. Residents can only make presentations to committees and community councils, not regional council, either through formal presentations prior to or public participation at the end of each meeting.

Standing Committees
There are six standing committees of Regional Council. Each committee has six members. The Executive Committee is composed of the Mayor, Deputy Mayor, and Chair or designated representative appointed by each of the other five standing committees.  The remaining five standing committees are appointed through a process that sees each community council appoint a representative to ensure geographic balance, and the remaining three members appointed by Council based on expressions of interest.

 Executive Standing Committee
 Appeals Standing Committee
 Audit & Finance Standing Committee
 Community Planning & Economic Development Standing Committee
 Environment & Sustainability Standing Committee
 Transportation Standing Committee

Advisory committees
There are eighteen advisory committees of Council, 12 appointed by Regional Council and reporting to it through the Standing Committees, and 6 appointed by and reporting to Community Councils.

Advisory Committees of Regional Council
 Accessibility Advisory Committee  
 Active Transportation Advisory Committee 
 ArtsHalifax Advisory Committee 
 Community Design Advisory Committee 
 Design Review Committee 
 Grants Committee 
 Halifax Explosion 100th Anniversary Advisory Committee 
 Heritage Advisory Committee 
 Investment Policy Advisory Committee
 Port Wallace Community Public Participation Committee 
 Regional Watersheds Advisory Board 
 Special Events Advisory Committee

Advisory committees of community councils
 Districts 7 & 8 Planning Advisory Committee 
 North West Planning Advisory Committee 
 Point Pleasant Park Advisory Committee 
 St. Margaret's Bay Coastal Planning Advisory Committee 
 Western Common Advisory Committee

Boards and commissions
There are two broad types of boards and commission to which HRM appoints Councillors and citizens.  First, there are four boards of the regional municipality described by provincial statute that function as arms length boards delivering municipal services, or managing municipal assets.  The second are external boards that have been established by other levels of government (Airport, Seaport, etc), are organizations that HRM is a voluntary member of (UNSM, etc) or via contract with HRM but are not subject to direct control by the municipality (Halifax Partnership, etc).

Boards of Regional Municipality
 Halifax Board of Police Commissioners
 Halifax Regional Library Board
 Halifax Regional Water Commission
 Shubenacadie Canal Commission

External Board Appointments
 Alderney Landing
 Canadian Urban Transit Association
 Otter Lake Community Monitoring Committee 
 Federation of Canadian Municipalities (National Board of Directors)
 Nova Scotia Federation of Municipalities
 Destination Halifax
 Halifax Partnership
 Halifax Harbour Bridges
 Halifax International Airport Authority Board
 Halifax Port Authority 
 Metropolitan Regional Housing Authority 
 Events East

Community councils
A Community Council in Nova Scotia's Halifax Regional Municipality is a form of local government consisting of several councillors from the larger Halifax Regional Council. Community councils represent a geographic area covering anywhere from five to six municipal districts where councillors consider local matters, make recommendations to Halifax Regional Council, and provide opportunities for public input.  The current community councils were adopted after the 2012 election.

List of community councils
Halifax and West Community Council
Harbour East - Marine Drive Community Council
North West Community Council
Regional Centre Community Council

Current city council

Office of the Mayor
The Office of the Mayor is located on the third floor of Halifax City Hall. Staffing roles and hiring are directed by the Mayor with the support of the CAO.  The current staff of the office consists of

 Chief of Staff
 Special Assistant to the Mayor 
 Senior Policy Advisor
 Community Liaison Coordinator
 Administrative Support
 Administrative Assistant

Councillors
The Council Support Office  is located on the fourth floor of Halifax City Hall, with one remote office in Musquodoboit Harbour that is staffed part time, and other unstaffed offices in municipal buildings in some districts. Staffing roles and hiring are the responsibility of the Manager Council Support under the office of the CAO. The current staff of the office consists of nine full time and two part time staff, including the manager.

Elections
Elections are held every four years on leap years. By-elections for council seats have been held in 1998, 1999, 2003, 2006, 2007, and 2019 after some regional councillors were elected to the provincial legislature.

An examination of boundaries took place throughout 2003/04 upon which there was a redistribution of districts. The 2004 municipal election saw the combination of two districts into one in Cole Harbour, as well as the creation of a new district in Clayton Park West.

Election results
 2020 Halifax municipal election
 2016 Halifax municipal election
 2012 Halifax municipal election 
2008 Halifax municipal election
2004 Halifax municipal election

See also
 List of mayors of the Halifax Regional Municipality for a list of mayors for the Halifax Regional Municipality
 List of mayors of Halifax, Nova Scotia for a list of mayors for the former City of Halifax, from 1841 - 1996.
 List of mayors of Dartmouth, Nova Scotia for a list of mayors for the former City of Dartmouth, from 1873 - 1996.
 List of mayors of Bedford, Nova Scotia for a list of mayors for the former Town of Bedford, from 1979 - 1996.
 List of wardens of Halifax County, Nova Scotia for a list of wardens for former Halifax County, from 1879 - 1996.

References

External links
 Halifax Regional Council

Government in Halifax, Nova Scotia
Municipal councils in Nova Scotia